Kajarestan (also Romanized as Kajārestān; also known as Gajarestān) is a village in Khorram Dasht Rural District, Kamareh District, Khomeyn County, Markazi Province, Iran. At the 2006 census, its population was 281, in 69 families.

References 

Populated places in Khomeyn County